Kypria is an annual festival staged at various venues across Cyprus in September and October. It is organised by the Cyprus Ministry of Education and Culture. The festival brings to Cyprus some of the world's best artists in the fields of music, dance and performance art. Art and photography exhibitions, opera and ballet are included in a richly varied programme. The festival has been running since 1990 and is considered the premier cultural event of the year, with each new edition eagerly awaited.

Kypria Festival 2010
Kypria 2010 begins on September 3 with contemporary dance and continues with music followed by theater performances and philharmonic concerts. The international festival's highlights are dedicated to the commemoration of the 50 years since the founding of the Republic of Cyprus organized and coordinated by the Ministry of Culture. Planned activities can be seen on websites linked below.

Past performances have included Complexions New York Contemporary Ballet, Béjart Ballet, Joaquín Cortés, Eifman Ballet of St Petersburg, National Theatre of Greece, Alkinoos Ioannidis, Dulce Pontes with George Dalaras, Mario Frangoulis, Milva, Oxford Philomusica, opera performances of The Barber of Seville, Madama Butterfly and many other concerts, plays and performances by local and international artists.

References

External links
 Festival's Official Programme 2010
 Festival's Media Gallery

Festivals in Cyprus
Autumn events in Cyprus